Mount Pisgah is a mountain located in the Catskill Mountains of New York southeast of Bovina Center. Grays Mountain, Fords Hill, and Dingle Hill are located south of Mount Pisgah.

References

Mountains of Delaware County, New York
Mountains of New York (state)